Afigya Kwabre District is a former district that was located in Ashanti Region, Ghana. It was created from the western portion of Afigya-Sekyere District (now currently known as Sekyere South District) and the western portion of Kwabre District (now currently known as Kwabre East Municipal District) on 1 November 2007 (effectively 29 February 2008). However on 15 March 2018, it was split off into two new districts: Afigya Kwabre South District (capital: Kodie) and Afigya Kwabre North District (capital: Boamang). The district assembly was the northern part of Ashanti Region and had Kodie as its capital town.

Sources
 
 GhanaDistricts.com

References

Districts of Ashanti Region